Syzygium courtallense is a species of plant in the family Myrtaceae. It is endemic to India.  It is threatened by habitat loss.

References

Flora of India (region)
courtallense
Critically endangered plants
Taxonomy articles created by Polbot